Lee Moorhouse (1850–1926) of Pendleton, Oregon, United States, was a photographer and an Indian agent for the Umatilla Indian Reservation.  From 1888 to 1916, he produced over 9,000 images documenting urban, rural, and Native American life in the Columbia Basin, and particularly Umatilla County, Oregon.

Life
Thomas Leander Moorhouse was born in Marion County, Iowa and as a child traveled along the Oregon Trail to Walla Walla, Washington with his family in 1861. As an adult, he worked as a miner, surveyor, rancher, businessman, civic leader, real estate operator, and  insurance salesman.  In addition to acting as an Indian agent, from 1879 to 1883 he served as an Assistant Adjutant General of the Third Brigade of the Oregon State Militia.

Photography

Moorhouse considered himself an amateur photographer, but in the 1880s the hobby became an increasingly important part of his life. He knew Walter S. Bowman, a professional photographer in Pendelton.

Unlike most amateur photographers of the period, Moorhouse worked with and mastered the cumbersome and exacting equipment of professionals, including gelatin dry glass plate negatives, large cameras, and a tripod.  Critics believe his work reflects a keen eye, a deep appreciation for history and an intense interest in his world that went beyond the amateur.  Moorhouse's photographs of members of the Cayuse, Walla Walla, and Umatilla are of particular significance.
 
Like other Western U.S. photographers of this period, Moorhouse documented the appearance, costume and lifestyles of native peoples.  Many of these characteristics were to disappear under Western cultural pressure.  He, like other photographers of the time, depicted a romantic view of their subjects, staging shots to reflect their personal viewpoints and, in doing so, alter details and create inaccurate images.  In Moorhouse's case, there are significant differences between two broad categories of his work with native people.  His studio portraits of tribal members, which during his lifetime were considered his best work, are stiffly posed and probably inauthentic.  Records indicate that Moorhouse supplied his subjects, from an extensive collection of Native American artifacts, with the clothing they wore and the implements they held.  In contrast, his images of native life on the Umatilla Reservation accurately reflect native clothing and dwellings of the time.  They also document some of the social and cultural transformations that native peoples experienced during this period of cultural conflict.  Moorhouse's images have recently been recognized as valuable for eliciting the memories of the past among Umatilla tribal elders, with these stories adding to the archive of the native culture.

Moorhouse also captured a significant variety of images on the development of the Oregon Territory.  Six hundred views of ranch life, particularly wheat farming, document the ranchers, their homes, itinerant laborers, and their work in the fields. There are also thousands of images of small town and community life;  businesses, schools, churches, and various forms of transportation, such as locomotives and automobiles.  Social functions and entertainments appear in his photographs of circuses, parades, Wild West shows, and most notably the Pendleton Roundup in Pendleton, Oregon.

Moorhouse published a short book of photographs and created postcards featuring his work.  As many as 100,000 postcards may have been sold.

Three hundred of his photographs were purchased by the U.S. Bureau of American Ethnology in the 1930s. Seven thousand images by Moorhouse are maintained by the Special Collections & University Archives of the University of Oregon Libraries; the Moorhouse family donated the photographs in 1948.  Another 1,400 images were given to the Umatilla County Library in about 1958.

References  

Grafe, Steven L. Lee Moorhouse: Photographer of the Inland Empire. Oregon Historical Quarterly 98, 4 (Winter 1997-98).
Grafe, Steven J. "Peoples of the Plateau:  The Indian Photographs of Lee Moorhouse, 1898-1915.  University of Oklahoma Press.
Sandweiss, Martha A.   Picturing Indians: Curtis in Context, in The Plains Indian Photographs of Edward S. Curtis (Lincoln 2001).
Schmitt, Martin.  The Moorhouse Photographic Collection." The Call Number 15, 1 (December 1953).
Walker, Deward E.  The Moorhouse Collection: A Window on Umatilla History," in The First Oregonians'', ed. by Carolyn M. Buan and Richard Lewis (Portland 1991).

External links  
 Moorhouse Digital Collection at the University of Oregon
 Peoples of the Plateau.  The Indian Photographs of Lee Moorhouse, 1898-1915, a 2008 exhibition at the Burke Museum of Natural History and Culture

United States Indian agents
Photographers from Oregon
1850 births
People from Marion County, Iowa
People from Pendleton, Oregon
1926 deaths
Place of death missing
People from Walla Walla, Washington